Kone is a Finnish elevator engineering and service company, founded in 1910.

Kone, KONE, Koné and variants may also refer to:

Broadcasting
KONE (FM), radio station in Texas
KHIT, Nevada radio station formerly known as KONE

People
Koné (surname), list of people with the surname

Places
Kone (Phrygia), town of ancient Phrygia
Kone (volcano), a volcano in Ethiopia
Koné, New Caledonia
Koné, Burkina Faso

Other uses
Niveas kone, a moth, named after the Finnish engineering company

See also
Cone (disambiguation)
Kone- ja Siltarakennus, former Finnish engineering company, 1892–1938